Greatest Love or The Greatest Love may refer to:

Film and television
 The Greatest Love (1920 film), an American drama film directed by Henry Kolker
 The Greatest Love (2019 film), a Burmese romantic drama film
 The Greatest Love (South Korean TV series), a 2011 romantic comedy
 The Greatest Love (Philippine TV series), a 2016 melodrama

Music
 "Greatest Love" (Ciara song), 2019
 The Greatest Love World Tour, a 1986 Whitney Houston concert tour
 "Greatest Love", a song by Brotherhood of Man from B for Brotherhood, 1978
 "The Greatest Love", a song by Billy Joe Royal, 1967

See also
 The Greatest Love of All (disambiguation)
 Her Greatest Love, a 1917 silent film